Charles Ernest Whistler "Christopher" Mackintosh (31 October 1903 – 12 January 1974) was a Scottish rugby union internationalist, athlete, skier and bobsledder who competed in the 1920s and 1930s. He won a gold medal in the four-man bobsleigh event at the 1938 FIBT World Championships in Garmisch-Partenkirchen. Mackintosh also became Chairman of the Henry Lunn Alpine Tours company (part of the Lunn Poly group) and President of both the Downhill Only Ski Club Wengen (1958-1964) and the Amateur Inter-Ski Club, the Kandahar Ski Club.

Mackintosh competed in skiing from 1923 to 1933. He finished sixth in the men's long jump at the 1924 Summer Olympics in Paris. He also won the Inferno ski race, the third time it was held.

He married Lady Jean Douglas-Hamilton, daughter of Duke Alfred Douglas-Hamilton and his wife, the animal welfare activist Nina Poore.  Chris and Jean's four children, Sheena Mackintosh, Vora Mackintosh, Douglas Mackintosh, and Charlach Mackintosh all represented Great Britain in skiing events in the Winter Olympics.

The Mackintosh surname is not Scottish.  It is derived from Chris's paternal grandfather, Aeneas John Mackintosh and great-grandfather John McIntosh. Aeneas was a picture-framer from Bethnal Green, London who worked for and married Marie Anna Rochefort. Her framing business traded as "Marian Rochefort".

References

External links
Bobsleigh four-man world championship medalists since 1930
Wallechinsky, David and Jaime Loucky (2008). "Track & Field (Men): Long Jump". In The Complete Book of the Olympics: 2008 Edition. London: Aurum Press Ltd. p. 218.

http://kandahar.org.uk/inter_club_web_site/images/aiic_2011_dho_journal.pdf

1903 births
1974 deaths
Athletes (track and field) at the 1924 Summer Olympics
Olympic athletes of Great Britain
Scottish male bobsledders
Scotland international rugby union players
Scottish male long jumpers
Scottish Olympic competitors
Scottish rugby union players
Scottish male skiers